Raymond Lebègue (16 August 1895 – 21 November 1984) was a 20th-century French literary historian. The son of palaeographer Henri Lebègue, he was elected a member of the Académie des Inscriptions et Belles-Lettres in 1955.

He cofounded the Revue d'histoire du théâtre with his friend Louis Jouvet.

Selected publications 
1925: Stendhal, Armance ou quelques scènes d'un salon de Paris en 1827, Geneva/Paris 1986 (preface by André Gide)
1944: La Tragédie française de la Renaissance, Brüssel
1951: La Poésie française de 1560 à 1630. De Ronsard à Malherbe. Malherbe et son temps, 2 volumes, Paris 1945–1947
1949: Robert Garnier, Œuvres complètes
1966: Ronsard. L'homme et l'œuvre
1968: Malherbe, Oeuvres poétiques, with René Fromilhague)
1972: Le théâtre comique en France de "Pathelin à "Mélite"
1976: Peiresc, Lettres à Malherbe 1606–1628
1977–1978: Études sur le théâtre français, 2 volumes
1979: Aspects de Chateaubriand. Vie, voyage en Amérique, œuvres

External links 
 Biography on the site of the comité des travaux historiques et scientifiques
 Allocution à l'occasion du décès de M. Raymond Lebègue on Persée
 La poésie baroque en France pendant les guerres de religion
 Notice on the site of the Académie Française

Romance philologists
French philologists
Academic staff of the University of Paris
Literary historians
20th-century French historians
Members of the Académie des Inscriptions et Belles-Lettres
1895 births
Writers from Paris
1984 deaths
20th-century philologists